Facies is a body of rock with specified characteristics.

Facies may also refer to:
 Facies (medical)
Facies of the pile dwellings and of the dammed settlements

See also

Feces
Faces